is a Shingon Buddhist temple in Arashiyama, Kyoto Prefecture, Japan. The temple is said to have been constructed by Gyōki in 713 AD, and was originally named . It is dedicated to Ākāśagarbha(Sanskrit:आकाशकर्भ,Japanese:虚空蔵:kokūzō) 
the bodhisattva (Sanskrit: बोधिसत्त्वः, Japanese:菩薩) of the boundless space.

It is one of the Thirteen Buddhist Sites of Kyoto.

References 
 Kōjien, 5th edition
 Daijirin, 3rd edition

External links 
Official website

Buddhist temples in Kyoto